Lan Trì kiến văn lục (蘭池見聞錄) is a literary work of Vũ Trinh.

Vũ Trinh was a Confucianist and high-ranking mandarin. He left some literary works. The book Lan Trì kiến văn lục is one of those and is composed of an introduction, forewords, preface and preamble (written in Chinese by Vu Trinh's colleagues) and 45 creative pieces (written by Vu Trinh himself). The book is composed of simple short stories of the end of 18th century beginning of 19th century. It is an interesting creative work from the literary angle, and contains useful material about language's evidences for understanding formation and development of one of the most popular literary genres of Vietnam, the genre of a short story.

Sources 
 Lan Trì kiến văn lục (VHv.1401), Viện nghiên cứu Hán nôm
 Đại Nam liệt truyện, Quốc sử quán triều Nguyễn

Vietnamese-language literature
Vietnamese short story collections
Chinese-language literature of Vietnam